Florence Dinichert (born 7 March 1977) is a Swiss modern pentathlete. She represented Switzerland at the 2000 Summer Olympics held in Sydney, Australia in the women's modern pentathlon and she finished in 12th place.

References

External links 
 

1977 births
Living people
Swiss female modern pentathletes
Olympic modern pentathletes of Switzerland
Modern pentathletes at the 2000 Summer Olympics